Alexander Rudolph Broome (born March 13, 1921) was an American baseball pitcher in the Negro leagues. He played with the Cleveland Bears in 1940 and when they became the Jacksonville Red Caps in 1941 and 1942.  He earned the nickname "Satchel" due to his pitch speed, a nod to Satchel Paige.

References

External links
 and Seamheads

Cleveland Bears players
Jacksonville Red Caps players
Baseball players from Florida
Baseball pitchers
1921 births
Possibly living people